Bryce Kindopp (born June 14, 1999) is a Canadian professional ice hockey Forward who is currently playing for the San Diego Gulls in the American Hockey League (AHL) as a prospect for the Anaheim Ducks of the National Hockey League (NHL).

Playing career 
Kindopp first played as a youth within his hometown of Lloydminster, Alberta, with the Blazers, Heat and Rage before appearing in the Alberta Junior Hockey League with the Lloydminster Bobcats. He was selected in the 2014 WHL Bantam Draft with the 49th overall pick by the Everett Silvertips and made his debut with the team during the following 2014–15 season.

Kindopp played six seasons within the Silvertips, captaining the club in his final major junior year in posting careers bests with 40 goals and 74 points through 63 games in the 2019-20 season. On March 4, 2020, Kindopp was signed as an undrafted free agent, to a three-year, entry-level contract with the Anaheim Ducks.

Kindopp made his professional debut in the pandemic delayed 2020–21 season in the ECHL with the Tulsa Oilers. After registering 4 points through 14 games, Kindopp was reassigned by the Ducks to primary affiliate, the San Diego Gulls of the AHL upon the commencement of the season. Through his rookie season, Kindopp showed offensive promise in contributing with 10 goals and 20 points through 39 regular season games.

In the following  season, Kindopp remained with the Gulls before he received his first recall by the Ducks on January 5, 2022. He made his NHL debut that night, playing in a fourth-line role, in a 4–1 victory over the Philadelphia Flyers. He was returned to the Gulls in the AHL the following day.

Career statistics

Awards and honours

References

External links
 

1999 births
Living people
Anaheim Ducks players
Everett Silvertips players
San Diego Gulls (AHL) players
Tulsa Oilers (1992–present) players
Undrafted National Hockey League players